USNS Samuel L. Cobb (T-AOT-1123) was originally named the MV Samuel L. Cobb and used for transport of military assets in various theaters. It was not until the outbreak of the Iraq war in 2003 when the ship was purchased by the United States Navy that it was fully put under the operation of Military Sealift Command. This ship also had a refit to expand its abilities to do underway replenishment of multiple ships.

The ship was named after Samuel L. Cobb, the Master of the  during World War II. Cobb was awarded the Merchant Marine Distinguished Service Medal for heroism and meritorious service under unusual hazards.

References

Marinetraffic stats page
JAQUELYN E PETERSON blog
Samuel L Cobb Award page

1985 ships
Champion-class tankers